The Ayrshire and Renfrewshire Football League was a short-lived competitive football league in the period from 1903 to 1905. For membership, it drew upon Junior football teams based in the south-western Scottish counties of Ayrshire and Renfrewshire. Created by the Scottish Football Association, the league was intended to provide its member teams with fixtures on unused Saturdays during the footballing season.

History
This Scottish football league was one of a number of supplementary football leagues that operated in the late 19th and early 20th centuries. Like several other such leagues of the same period, it proved an unsuccessful experiment at a time when numerous local cup and five-a-side competitions were often seen as more important (see Scottish Football (Defunct Leagues) for other examples). It appears that there were no outright winners in the two seasons that it operated. The league disintegrated midway through the 1904–05 season.

The member clubs for each season were:

1903–04 Season Annbank, Galston, Irvine Academicals, Johnstone, Maybole and Paisley Academicals competed to the extent of fulfilling at least one fixture each. Beith, Kilbarchan and Kilwinning Eglinton all resigned without fulfilling any fixtures.

1904–05 Season Ayr Academicals, Hurlford, Johnstone, Kilwinning Eglinton, Lanemark and Maybole began the season as members of this league. However, none completed their full fixture-list for the season, and the competition was wound up

See also
Scottish Football (Defunct Leagues)

Defunct football leagues in Scotland